Jonathan "John" Silver (born 1950) was the second drummer for the English rock band Genesis.  He replaced Chris Stewart in the summer of 1968 and appears on their first full-length album, From Genesis to Revelation, and on the Genesis Archive 1967-75 box set.  He left the band in August 1969 and was replaced by John Mayhew after leaving to study at Cornell University.

John Silver was educated at St Edward's School, Oxford, and Genesis rehearsed at his parents' house in Oxford.

Silver lives in London with his wife, Lucy, and children, Leo, Max, and Libby. Silver worked briefly at Thames Television in London in the 1980s.

In 1973, Anthony Phillips, Mike Rutherford and Phil Collins recorded a song dedicated to Silver, called "Silver Song". This recording and other versions of the song have been included on albums by Phillips. Silver also appears on the 1973 recording "Fantomas Opening Theme" which appears on Phillips' Archive Collection Volume II.

References

1950 births
Living people
Place of birth missing (living people)
People educated at St Edward's School, Oxford
Cornell University alumni
English rock drummers
Genesis (band) members